Seth Stammler (born September 29, 1981 in Columbus, Ohio) is a retired American soccer player.

Career

College
Stammler attended Gahanna Middle School East and Gahanna Lincoln High School, and played four years of college soccer at the University of Maryland, captaining the team in his sophomore, junior, and senior seasons. He appeared in 87 matches for Maryland scoring  8 goals.

Professional
Stammler was selected 18th overall in the 2004 MLS SuperDraft by the MetroStars.  However, during preseason, Stammler suffered an ankle injury that kept him out for much of the season.  Joining the squad late in the year, Stammler registered only a minute of playing time as a rookie. He saw more playing time in his second season, and played effectively in left midfield in the playoffs.

The 2006 season saw Stammler establish himself as the club's starting left side midfielder. His versatility and overall solid play saw him appear in 29 matches (27 starts) in which he registered three goals and five assists. Stammler scored his first MLS goal May 20, 2006 with a long-range shot against Chivas USA. He added a header for his second goal in the same game in a 5-4 Red Bull win.

In 2007 Stammler began the season as the team's starting defensive midfielder. His tenacious play helped guide the club to an impressive start. Later in the season Stammler was shifted to defense due  to his ability to play the ball out of the back. He concluded the campaign appearing in 29 matches (28 starts), registering two assists. In 2008 Stammler continued his solid play appearing in 26 matches and scoring one goal. He also served as the club's vice-captain, a role he continued to serve during the 2009 season in which he appeared in 26 league matches. In 2008 Stammler scored against Barcelona in a 6-2 loss.

During the 2010 campaign coach Hans Backe decided to take advantage of Stammler's versatility utilizing him as a left sided midfielder as well as in his familiar role of a holding midfielder. On June 5, 2010 Stammler helped New York to a 1-0 victory over Chivas USA scoring on a long-range shot reminiscent of the goal he scored against Chivas in 2006 which was his first MLS goal.

In September 2010, Stammler announced that he would be retiring at the close of the 2010 season to attend The University of Chicago Booth School of Business.
Seth Stammler is now employed by Morgan Stanley and works on the municipal bond desk.

International
During his days as a college player Stammler played with the U.S Under-23 in Portugal as a defender. In 2008 in an interview Stammler said former USA national team captain Claudio Reyna mentioned his name to Bob Bradley but a call up never came.

Personal
Stammler is involved with a non-profit organization named The Sporting Chance Foundation . The foundation aims to help Haitian children gain access to education, and provides clean water through building community water wells.

Honors

Club
New York Red Bulls
MLS Cup
Runners-up (1): 2008
MLS Eastern Conference
Winners (Regular Season) (1): 2010
MLS Western Conference
Winners (Playoff) (1): 2008
Minor Trophies
Atlantic Cup (2): 2003, 2010
La Manga Cup (1): 2004
Walt Disney World Pro Soccer Classic (1): 2010

Individual
MLS Humanitarian of the Year: 2010

Career statistics

References

External links
 
 University of Maryland profile

1981 births
Living people
American soccer players
Soccer players from Columbus, Ohio
Major League Soccer players
Maryland Terrapins men's soccer players
New York Red Bulls players
United States men's under-23 international soccer players
New York Red Bulls draft picks
Lincoln High School (Gahanna, Ohio) alumni
Association football midfielders